Bivolje Brdo is a village in Herzegovina, in Čapljina municipality, Federation of Bosnia and Herzegovina, Bosnia and Herzegovina.

Population

Ethnic composition
Total: 841

 Muslims - 562 (66.82%)
 Croats - 256 (30.43%)
 Yugoslavs - 6 (0.71%)
 Serbs - 4 (0.47%)
 others and unknown - 13 (1.54%)

Total: 1026 (2013)

 Muslims - 506 (49.06%)
 Croats                        - 509 (49.09%)
 Others                            - 11

References

External links 

 Čapljina Portal umrli

 Official results from the book: Ethnic composition of Bosnia-Herzegovina population, by municipalities and settlements, 1991. census, Zavod za statistiku Bosne i Hercegovine - Bilten no.234, Sarajevo 1991.

Villages in the Federation of Bosnia and Herzegovina
Populated places in Čapljina
https://www.citypopulation.de/php/bosnia-hercegovackoneretvanski.php?cityid=110426